Manuel Moreno Sánchez (born 25 April 1967) is a Spanish sprinter. He competed in the men's 4 × 400 metres relay at the 1992 Summer Olympics.

References

1967 births
Living people
Athletes (track and field) at the 1992 Summer Olympics
Spanish male sprinters
Olympic athletes of Spain
Place of birth missing (living people)